Margaretha Charlotte Adelheid (Margreeth) Smilde (born 6 June 1954 in Leeuwarden) is a former Dutch politician. As a member of the Christian Democratic Appeal (Christen-Democratisch Appèl) she was an MP from 26 July 2002 to 29 January 2003, from 3 June 2003 to 29 November 2006 and from 23 January 2008 to 19 September 2012. She focused on matters of public health, constitutional affairs and the Royal House.

Decorations 
 In 2012 she was awarded Knight of the Order of Orange-Nassau.

References 
  Parlement.com biography

1954 births
Living people
Christian Democratic Appeal politicians
Protestant Church Christians from the Netherlands
Knights of the Order of Orange-Nassau
Members of the House of Representatives (Netherlands)
People from Leeuwarden
21st-century Dutch politicians
21st-century Dutch women politicians